Daijiworld 24x7 is a Mangalore based multilingual television station established in 2014.

Programmes

See also
Media in Karnataka

References 

Television stations in Mangalore
2014 establishments in Karnataka
Television channels and stations established in 2014
Konkani-language television stations
Kannada-language television channels